Ra'anana West railway station is an Israel Railways passenger station in the median of Highway 531, between the cities of Ra'anana and Herzliya, as part of the Sharon Railway.

The addition of this station and its sister station Ra'anana South, is intended reduce travel time for Ra'anana residents to Tel-Aviv to approximately 11 minutes. The station was scheduled to open on 1 July 2018 but was delayed till 3 July.

Location
The station building is located at ground level, west of Route 541 (Jerusalem Avenue) and north of Highway 531, and is accessible only from the Ra'anana side of the highway.

The station building is of the shape of a book lying on its side. Its floor area is 600m², and is connected through a 50m footbridge to the platforms, which are below ground. Each platform is 300m long.

Train service

Ridership

References

Railway stations in Central District (Israel)
Ra'anana
Railway stations opened in 2018